Amlamé is a town in the Plateaux Region of Togo. It is located on the main highway between Atakpame and Kpalime (about 30 km from the former and 70 km from the latter). Administratively, it is the seat of the Amou Prefecture.

Amlamé is the Francization of the original Akposso name, Emla.

History 
Amlame is a town in the plateau region, Togo. people from this town are celebrating Ovazu as their traditional celebration.

Geography

References 

Populated places in Plateaux Region, Togo